The first season of the German singing competition The Masked Singer premiered on 27 June 2019 on ProSieben. The panelists were Collien Ulmen-Fernandes, Max Giesinger and Ruth Moschner. The host was Matthias Opdenhövel.

On 1 August 2019, the Astronaut (singer Max Mutzke) was declared the winner and the Grashüpfer (singer Gil Ofarim) was the runner-up.

Panelists and host

Following the announcement of the series, it was confirmed by ProSieben on 16 May 2019 that Matthias Opdenhövel would host the show. On 17 June 2019 it was confirmed by the channel that the rateteam or panelists would consist of actor Collien Ulmen-Fernandes, singer Max Giesinger and TV presenter Ruth Moschner.

After every live episode, was aired a spin-off show with the name The Masked Singer - red. Special, the hosts were Viviane Geppert (episodes 1, 3 and 5) and Annemarie Carpendale (episodes 2, 4 and 6). The show features interviews from the judges and the unmasked celebrity from that episode. In the Final Carpendale hosted also, the red. - The Masked Singer Countdown, which aired for 15 Minutes before the final.

Guest panelists
Throughout the season, various guest panelists appeared as the fourth judge in the judging panel for one episode. These guest panelists included:

Contestants
Among the masked are winners of 41 gold records, 10 × platinum, double platinum, 4-platinum, athletes, German champions, world champions, Golden Camera and Bambi winner and winner of a merit order.

Episodes

Week 1 (27 June)

Week 2 (4 July)

Week 3 (11 July)

Week 4 (18 July)

Week 5 (25 July) – Semi-final

Week 6 (1 August) – Final
 Group number: "Bohemian Rhapsody" by Queen

Round One

Round Two

Round Three

Reception

Ratings

References

External links
 

2019 German television seasons
The Masked Singer (German TV series)